Xavier Léon (21 May 1868, Boulogne-Billancourt - 21 October 1935, Paris) was a French-Jewish philosopher and historian of philosophy.

In 1893 Léon – together with Élie Halévy and others – helped found the French philosophical journal Revue de métaphysique et de morale. Léon remained editor of the journal until his death in 1935, when he was succeeded by Dominique Parodi. In 1900 he founded the International Congress of Philosophy, and in 1901 the Société Française de Philosophie. He wrote extensively on Johann Gottlieb Fichte. He is buried in the Jewish section of Père-Lachaise Cemetery.

Works
La philosophie de Fichte, ses rapports avec la conscience contemporaine, Paris: F. Alcan, 1902
Fichte et son temps, Paris: A Colin, 1922
Établissement et prédication de la doctrine de la liberté : la vie de Fichte jusqu'au départ d'Jéna (1762-1799), 1922
La lutte pour l'affranchissement national (1806 - 1813), 1924
Fichte à Berlin (1799 - 1813) : la lutte pour l'affranchissement national (1806 - 1813), 1927

References

1868 births
1935 deaths
19th-century French Jews
Jewish philosophers
19th-century French philosophers
French historians of philosophy
French male non-fiction writers
People from Boulogne-Billancourt
Jewish French writers